A. P. Carter Homeplace is a historic home located at Maces Spring, Scott County, Virginia. It is a small, one-story, half-dovetailed log cabin, with a single room on the first floor and loft above. The house is most notable for its association with a traditional American folk music group that recorded between 1927 and 1956.  It is the birthplace of Alvin Pleasant "A.P." Delaney Carter (1891–1960) of the Carter Family.

It was listed on the National Register of Historic Places in 1976.

References

Cash–Carter family residences
Houses on the National Register of Historic Places in Virginia
Houses in Scott County, Virginia
National Register of Historic Places in Scott County, Virginia
Log buildings and structures on the National Register of Historic Places in Virginia
1891 establishments in Virginia